Street Life in London was a 1877 book written by Adolphe Smith with photography by John Thomson.

The book is considered by some to be the first example of social documentary photography.

Production 
Street Life in London was a 1877 publication of a collaboration between the radical social journalist Adolphe Smith and Scottish photographer John Thomson. It was published by Sampson Low, Marston, Searle and Rivington, in London.

The authors believed they were continuing the important work of Henry Mayhew, who published London Labour and the London Poor, but that they were adding a unique value by incorporating photography to the ongoing documentation of London's working class poor.

Synopsis 

The book gives the reader an insight into the daily lives of working class and poor Londoners. It is arranged around photographs by Thomson with accompanying text by Smith. The texts are brief, but include detail, including information from interviewing the photograph's subjects. Subjects include flower-sellers, chimney-sweeps, shoe-blacks, chair-caners, musicians, dustmen and locksmiths.

Reception 
Street Life in London is considered the first or at least one of the earliest examples of social documentary photography. The book described its aim "to bring before the public some account of the present condition of the London street folk, and to supply a series of faithful pictures of the people themselves."

Author Emily Kathryn Morgan published Street Life in London: Context and Commentary in 2014 which addresses both the successes and failures of the original book.

References 

1877 books
Social documentary photography

Books about London
Books about poverty
Books about social history
Books of photographs
1877 non-fiction books